Instant coffee is a beverage derived from brewed coffee beans that enables people to quickly prepare hot coffee by adding hot water or milk to coffee solids in powdered or crystallized form and stirring. The product was first invented in Invercargill, the largest city of the New Zealand region of Murihiku, in 1890. Instant coffee solids (also called soluble coffee, coffee crystals, coffee powder, or powdered coffee) refers to the dehydrated and packaged solids available at retail used to make instant coffee. Instant coffee solids are commercially prepared by either freeze-drying or spray drying, after which it can be rehydrated. Instant coffee in a concentrated liquid form, as a beverage, is also manufactured. 

Advantages of instant coffee include speed of preparation (instant coffee dissolves quickly in hot water), lower shipping weight and volume than beans or ground coffee (to prepare the same amount of beverage), and long shelf life—though instant coffee can spoil if not kept dry.  Instant coffee also reduces cleanup since there are no coffee grounds, and at least one study has found that it has a lower environmental footprint than drip filter coffee and capsule espresso coffee, on a prepared beverage basis, disregarding quality and appeal of the beverage produced.

History

Instant or soluble coffee was invented and patented in 1890, by David Strang of Invercargill, New Zealand, under patent number 3518 sold under the trading name Strang's Coffee citing the patented "Dry Hot-Air" process. Some modern sources have credited French humorist and writer Alphonse Allais with the invention.

The invention was previously attributed to Satori Kato, a Japanese scientist working in Chicago in 1901. Kato introduced the powdered substance in Buffalo, New York, at the Pan-American Exposition. George Constant Louis Washington developed his own instant coffee process shortly thereafter, and first marketed it commercially (1910). The Nescafé brand, which introduced a more advanced coffee refining process, was launched in 1938.

High-vacuum freeze-dried coffee was developed shortly after World War II, as an indirect result of wartime research into other areas. The National Research Corporation (NRC) was formed in Massachusetts as a process-development company employing high-vacuum technology. It developed high-vacuum processes to produce penicillin, blood plasma, and streptomycin for US military use. As the war ended, NRC looked to adapt its processes for peacetime uses. It formed Florida Foods Corporation to produce concentrated orange juice powder and originally sold its product to the United States Army. That company later changed its name to Minute Maid.

A concentrated coffee/milk/sugar mixture was produced for the Union army during the American Civil War under the name Essence of Coffee, a teaspoonful of which was mixed with a cup of hot water. It had the consistency of axle grease, and proved so unpopular with the troops that it was soon discontinued. The brand Camp Coffee, a coffee and chicory essence, was first produced in 1876 by Paterson & Sons Ltd in Scotland.

Use
Close to 50% of the world's green coffee is used to produce instant coffee.

As food

Instant coffee is available in powder or granulated form contained in glass and plastic jars, sachets, or tins. The user controls the strength of the resulting product by adding less or more powder or granules to the water.

Instant coffee is also convenient for preparing iced coffee like the Greek frappé.

In some countries, such as Portugal, Spain, and India, instant coffee is commonly mixed with hot milk instead of boiling water. In other countries, such as South Korea, instant coffee commonly comes pre-mixed with non-dairy creamer and sugar and is called "coffee mix". Said to have been popularised in the UK by GIs during World War II, instant coffee still accounts for over 75 percent of coffee bought to drink in British homes, as opposed to well under 10 percent in the U.S. and France and one percent in Italy.

In the United Kingdom, instant coffee granules are sometimes used to enhance the flavour of sauces used in preparing spaghetti Bolognese.

Non-food use
Instant coffee is one of the ingredients in Caffenol, a home-made, non-toxic black-and-white photographic developer. The other ingredients in the basic formula are ascorbic acid (vitamin C) and anhydrous sodium carbonate; some recipes also include potassium bromide as a fog-reducing agent. The active ingredient appears to be caffeic acid. Initial experiments on Caffenol were performed in 1995 at the Rochester Institute of Technology; addition of ascorbic acid began around 2000, yielding the improved Caffenol-C, which is less likely to stain negatives than the original formulation. Experiments have shown that cheaper, less desirable brands of coffee work better for this application than more expensive brands.

Production
As with regular coffee, the green coffee bean itself is first roasted to bring out flavour and aroma. Rotating cylinders containing the green beans and hot combustion gases are used in most roasting plants. When the bean temperature reaches  the roasting begins. It takes about 8–15 minutes to complete roasting. After cooling, the beans are then ground finely. Grinding reduces the beans to  pieces. Until here, the process is in general the same as for other types of coffee.

Extraction
To produce instant coffee, the soluble and volatile contents of the beans, which provide the coffee aroma and flavor, have to be extracted. This is done using water. The coffee concentration in the liquid is then increased by either evaporation or by freeze concentration.

Freeze drying

The basic principle of freeze drying is the removal of water by sublimation.

Since the mass production of instant coffee began in post-WWII America, freeze-drying has grown in popularity to become a common method. Although it is more expensive, it generally results in a higher-quality product.

 The coffee extract is rapidly frozen and is broken into small granules. (Slower freezing would lead to larger ice crystals and a porous product; it can also affect the colour of the coffee granules).
 The granules are sifted and sorted on size.
 Frozen coffee granules are placed in the drying chamber, often on metal trays.
 A vacuum is created within the chamber. The strength of the vacuum is critical in the speed of the drying and therefore the quality of the product. Care must be taken to produce a vacuum of suitable strength.
 The drying chamber is warmed, most commonly by radiation, but conduction is used in some plants and convection has been proposed in some small pilot plants. A possible problem with convection is uneven drying rates within the chamber, which would give an inferior product.
 Sublimation—the previously frozen water in the coffee granules expands to ten times its previous volume. The removal of this water vapor from the chamber is vitally important, making the condenser the most critical and expensive component in a freeze-drying plant.
 The freeze-dried granules are removed from the chamber and packaged.

Spray drying

Spray drying is preferred to freeze-drying in some cases because it allows larger scale economic production, shorter drying times, and because it produces fine rounded particles.

To achieve this, nozzle atomization is used. Various ways of nozzle atomization can be used each having its own advantages and disadvantages. The use of spray wheels requires that the drying towers have a wide radius to avoid the atomized droplets collecting onto the drying chamber walls.
 Completed in 5–30 seconds (dependent on factors such as heat, size of particle, and diameter of chamber).
 Moisture content change: IN = 75–85% OUT = 3–3.5%
 Air temperature: IN =  OUT = 

One drawback with spray drying is that the particles it produces are too fine to be used effectively by the consumer; they must first be either steam-fused in towers similar to spray dryers or by belt agglomeration to produce particles of suitable size.

Decaffeination

In commercial processes, the decaffeination of instant coffee almost always happens before the critical roasting process which will determine the coffee's flavour and aroma processes.

Byproducts
The main byproduct of the instant coffee production process is spent coffee grounds. These grounds can be used as biomass, for example to produce heat used in the manufacturing process. Roughly two times the mass in spent coffee grounds is generated for each quantity of soluble coffee.

Composition
The caffeine content of instant coffee is generally less than that of brewed coffee. One study comparing various home-prepared samples came to the result that regular instant coffee (not decaffeinated) has a median caffeine content of 66 mg per cup (range 29–117 mg per cup), with a median cup size of 225 ml (range 170-285 ml) and a caffeine concentration of 328 µg/ml (range 102-559 µg/ml). In comparison, drip or filter coffee was estimated to have a median caffeine content of 112 mg, with a median concentration of 621 µg/ml for the same cup size.

Regarding antioxidants, the polyphenol content of a 180 ml cup of instant coffee has been estimated to be approximately 320 mg, compared to approximately 400 mg in a cup of brewed coffee of the same size.

Health hazards

Malabsorption
Instant coffee decreases intestinal iron absorption more than drip coffee. One study estimated that, when a cup of instant coffee was ingested with a meal composed of semipurified ingredients, intestinal absorption was reduced from 5.88% to 0.97%, compared to an absorption of 1.64% with drip coffee. It was also estimated that, when the strength of the instant coffee was doubled, intestinal iron absorption fell to 0.53%. Apparently, however, there is no decrease in iron absorption when instant coffee is consumed 1 hour before a meal, but the same degree of inhibition as with simultaneous ingestion occurs when instant coffee is taken 1 hour after a meal.

Carcinogenicity
Instant coffee has been associated with an increased risk of bladder cancer in women when compared to regular coffee, whereas for men both instant and regular coffee have been associated with an increased bladder cancer risk. However, current review research suggests that there is no dose-response relationship between coffee drinking and bladder cancer, and that previous studies may have been confounded by unidentified risks of bladder cancer.

Per an FDA survey, brewed instant coffee has acrylamide levels of 3–7 ppb, which is less than brewed regular coffee, i.e. 6–13 ppb.

Regulation
In the EU, regulations include the following details:
 Species of coffee bean
 Geographical origin
 Processing detail
 Year of crop
 Solvents used in decaffeination
 Caffeine level

Various institutions govern the coffee industry and help to achieve standardisation and also release information to the public.
 International Coffee Organization (London)
 Codex Alimentarius Commission of the UN (Rome)
 National Coffee Association (New York)

See also

 Dalgona coffee
 Instant breakfast
 Instant soup
 Instant tea
 List of instant foods
 List of dried foods
 Powdered milk

References

Bibliography

External links

Types of coffee
Powdered drink mixes
Products introduced in 1909